Stavros Khristoforidis (born 20 April 1974) is a Greek biathlete. He competed at the 2002 Winter Olympics and the 2006 Winter Olympics.

References

1974 births
Living people
Greek male biathletes
Olympic biathletes of Greece
Biathletes at the 2002 Winter Olympics
Biathletes at the 2006 Winter Olympics
Sportspeople from Saxony
People from Görlitz (district)